Okano is a Japanese surname. Notable people with the surname include:

, Japanese sprinter
, Japanese physiologist
, Japanese volleyball player
, Japanese judoka
, Japanese footballer
, Japanese politician
, Japanese voice actor
, Japanese footballer
, Japanese manga artist
, Japanese footballer and manager
, Japanese manga artist
, Japanese composer
, Japanese volleyball player
, Japanese baseball player
Yuji Okano (born 1964), Japanese shot putter

Fictional characters
, a character in the manga series Assassination Classroom

Japanese-language surnames